Area code 246 is the telephone area code in the North American Numbering Plan (NANP) for Barbados.  Telecommunication services in Barbados are regulated by the Government of Barbados's telecommunications unit. The number 246 spells BIM on an alpha-numeric telephone keypad, a nickname for the island.

Due to a long established affiliation with the NANP, telephone numbers in Barbados are often styled as (246) NXX-xxxx. International standards, such as E.123, advocate the inclusion of the prefix +1 to indicate 246 is a part of the NANP.

History
Area code 246 was created in a split of area code 809, which was the original area code for most of the Caribbean. Permissive dialing was possible from 1 July 1996 to 15 January 1997 at which time all calls placed to Barbados required the use of the prefix +1 246 prefix.

Dialing procedures

To Barbados
 From within North America (NANP)
When calling Barbados from elsewhere in the North American Numbering Plan (e.g. from the United States or Canada), callers dial as if undertaking regular ten-digit dialing within those countries. Callers must simply dial +1 246  seven digit phone number.

 From outside NANP
When calling to Barbados from outside the NANP (e.g. from the United Kingdom), callers must dial their international dialling prefix followed by 1 to access the North American Numbering Plan.  For example, a call placed from the United Kingdom would be dialled as 00 + 1 + 246 + local seven digit phone number.  Failure to include the prefix "1" results in accessing country calling code 246 of British Indian Ocean Territory (Diego Garcia).

Within Barbados
When placing a phone call from Barbados, also known as HPNA, callers simply use seven-digit dialling (i.e. dialling the last seven digits of the phone number). Unlike in some other Caribbean islands, most residential landline subscribers have unlimited/un-metered rates for calling other local landlines.

To North America (NANP)
When calling to other places in the North American Numbering Plan, calls are dialed as if undertaking regular ten-digit dialing in those countries. Callers must simply dial 1 + NPA (area code) + seven digit phone number.

Though usually toll-free when dialled from the US, not all 1-800, 1-888, 1-877, or 1-866 are toll-free when being dialled from Barbados, and may be treated as a toll call.  If the number is not toll-free a recording will give directions of how to place a fee based call.

To areas outside the NANP
When calling to areas outside the NANP (e.g. the United Kingdom), callers dial 011 + country calling code + phone number. In the case of the UK, a user would dial 011 + 44 + area code + UK phone number.

Emergency calls and services
Police Force: 211, Ambulance: 511, Fire: 311
Information/Directory Assistance: 411
Operator: 0

Central office codes
In the NANP telephone format 1-NPA-NXX-xxxx, the central office codes fall in the position of NXX.  In 1996 the following central office numbering plan was put in place by the incumbent local exchange carrier.

Mobile operators
Following liberalisation of the telecommunications industry in Barbados, various central office codes were implemented for local mobile carriers.  The following COs were outlined in 2004 by the Minister of Energy and Public Utilities. In most cases Barbados numbers beginning with the following central office codes do not permit incoming collect calls.  This list was updated to include allocations for Ozone Wireless from 2014.

VoIP providers
310 - 359

Geographic
Other landline central office codes which have been activated include the following:
227, 228, 229, 270, 271, 272, 273, 274, 292, 367, 410, 412, 414, 415, 416, 417, 418, 419, 420, 421, 422, 423, 424, 425, 426, 427, 428, 429, 430, 431, 432, 433, 434, 435, 436, 437, 438, 439, 736, 737, 753, 757, 958, 976

See also
List of NANP area codes
Area codes in the Caribbean

References

Further reading 
 3 Cellular Licences Issued, March 7, 2003

External links
The Barbados Telecommunications Unit - In the Ministry of Foreign Affairs, Foreign Trade & International Business
North American Numbering Plan Administrator
List of Central Office exchanges from 246 Area Code

Communications in Barbados
Telecommunications in Barbados
246
Barbados communications-related lists